A virtual private network (VPN) service provides a proxy server to help users bypass Internet censorship such as geoblocking and users who want to protect their communications against data profiling or MitM attacks on hostile networks.

A wide variety of entities provide "VPNs" for several purposes. But depending on the provider and the application, they do not always create a true private network. Instead, many providers simply provide an Internet proxy that uses VPN technologies such as OpenVPN or WireGuard. Commercial VPN services are often used by those wishing to disguise or obfuscate their physical location or IP address, typically as a means to evade Internet censorship or geo-blocking.

Providers often market VPN services as privacy-enhancing, citing security features, such as encryption, from the underlying VPN technology. However, users must consider that when the transmitted content is not encrypted before entering the proxy, that content is visible at the receiving endpoint (usually the VPN service provider's site) regardless of whether the VPN tunnel itself is encrypted for the inter-node transport. The only secure VPN is where the participants have oversight at both ends of the entire data path or when the content is encrypted before it enters the tunnel.

On the client side, configurations intended to use VPN services as proxies are not conventional VPN configurations. However, they do typically utilize the operating system's VPN interfaces to capture the user's data to send to the proxy. This includes virtual network adapters on computer OSes and specialized "VPN" interfaces on mobile operating systems. A less common alternative is to provide a SOCKS proxy interface.

In computer magazines, VPN services are typically judged on connection speeds; privacy protection, including privacy at signup and grade of encryption; server count and locations; interface usability; and cost.
In order to determine the degree of privacy and anonymity, various computer magazines, such as PC World and PC Magazine, also take the provider's own guarantees and its reputation among news items into consideration.

Criticism and limitations 
Users are commonly exposed to misinformation on the VPN services market, which makes it difficult for them to tell apart vague and bold claims and facts in advertisements. According to Consumer Reports, VPN service providers have poor privacy and security practices and also make hyperbolic claims.

In 2019, VPN services were criticized on various grounds by British YouTuber and web developer Tom Scott. In 2022, he revised his position, stating that VPNs do have valid use cases, such as unlocking geoblocked websites, bypassing mobile throttling, and accessing blocked websites in restricted countries.

The New York Times has noted that users should reconsider whether a VPN service is worth their money.

VPN services are not sufficient for protection against browser fingerprinting.

TechRadar noted that, for privacy reasons, an independent VPN provider is recommended.

Legality

In March 2018, the use of unapproved VPN services was banned in China, as they can be used to circumvent the Great Firewall. Operators received prison sentences and were penalized with fines.

Russia has banned various VPN service providers in 2021.

Comparison of commercial virtual private network services

Definitions 
The following definitions clarify the meaning of some of the column headers in the comparison tables below.

Privacy 
PC Magazine recommends that users consider choosing a provider based in a country with no data retention laws, since that makes it easier for the service to keep a promise of no logging.
PC Magazine and TechRadar also suggest that users read the provider's logging policy before signing up for the service,
since some providers collect information about their customers' VPN usage.
PC World recommends that users avoid free services as a rule of thumb, and asserts that free services either sell their users' browsing data in aggregated form to researchers and marketers, or only offer a minimal amount of data transfer per month. Logitheque explains why there are so many VPN comparison websites on the web.

Notes

Technical features 

Notes

Availability

Encryption

Notes

References 

Virtual private network services
Internet privacy